Dietzia psychralcaliphila is a facultatively psychrophilic alkaliphile that grows on hydrocarbons. It is aerobic, non-motile and gram-positive. The type strain is ILA-1T (= JCM 10987T = IAM14896T = NCIMB 13777T).

References

Further reading
Sneath, Peter HA, et al. Bergey's manual of systematic bacteriology. Volume 5. Williams & Wilkins, 2012.
Nielsen, Per Halkjær, Holger Daims, and Hilde Lemmer, eds. FISH handbook for biological wastewater treatment: identification and quantification of microorganisms in activated sludge and biofilms by FISH. IWA Publishing, 2009.
Koerner, Roland J., Michael Goodfellow, and Amanda L. Jones. "The genus Dietzia: a new home for some known and emerging opportunist pathogens."FEMS Immunology & Medical Microbiology 55.3 (2009): 296–305.

External links

LPSN
Type strain of Dietzia psychralcaliphila at BacDive -  the Bacterial Diversity Metadatabase

Mycobacteriales
Bacteria described in 2002
Psychrophiles
Alkaliphiles